Bryan Carlos Schmidt (born 19 November 1995) is an Argentine professional footballer who plays as a forward for Villa San Carlos.

Career
Schmidt started in the youth of Argentine Primera División club Arsenal de Sarandí. He first featured in the senior matchday squad when he was selected on the substitutes bench for a 2013–14 league match against Belgrano on 11 May 2014. He subsequently made his first-team debut the following season on 6 December in a 1–6 away win against Atlético de Rafaela, his only appearance during the 2014 campaign. He made another appearance in the 2015 Argentine Primera División season. Destroyers of the Bolivian Primera División signed Schmidt in June 2018. He scored his first career goal on 19 August versus San José.

Schmidt wasn't registered by Destroyers for the 2019 campaign due to foreigner limits, though the club agreed to honour the remainder of his contract; until 30 June 2019. In the succeeding August, Schmidt returned to Argentina with Primera B Metropolitana's Villa San Carlos.

Career statistics
.

References

External links

1995 births
Living people
Footballers from La Plata
Argentine footballers
Association football forwards
Argentine expatriate footballers
Expatriate footballers in Bolivia
Argentine expatriate sportspeople in Bolivia
Argentine Primera División players
Bolivian Primera División players
Arsenal de Sarandí footballers
Club Destroyers players
Club Atlético Villa San Carlos footballers